is a Japanese retired football player.

Club statistics
Updated to end of 2018 season.

References

External links
Profile at Urawa Red Diamonds

1992 births
Living people
Fukuoka University alumni
Association football people from Fukuoka Prefecture
Japanese footballers
J1 League players
J2 League players
J3 League players
Avispa Fukuoka players
Urawa Red Diamonds players
Montedio Yamagata players
Thespakusatsu Gunma players
SC Sagamihara players
Association football midfielders